The Spanish Constitution of 1876, was the constitution enacted after the restoration of the Spanish monarchy. The constitution was a conservative text. It came into effect on 30 June 1876.

It remained in force until the coup d'etat by Miguel Primo de Rivera in 1923, which made it the longest lasting constitution of Spain hitherto.

External links
 Text of the Constitution 

Constitutions of Spain
1876 in law
Constitution
Spain 1876
Constitution of 1876